Yuri Ivanovich Vechkasov (6 June 1948 – 17 March 2022) was a Russian politician. He served in the Federation Council from 1996 to 2001. He died in Penza on 17 March 2022, at the age of 73.

References

1948 births
2022 deaths
People from Penza Oblast
Members of the Federation Council of Russia (1996–2000)
Recipients of the Order of the Red Banner of Labour
Recipients of the Order of Honour (Russia)